The Gallery was an art gallery and conceptual art project constructed and devised by the artist Nicholas Wegner, later in partnership with artist Vaughan Grylls which ran from 1973 to 1978. The Gallery was located on Lisson Street in London and presented a series of projects critiquing and satirising trends in the 1970s UK art-world. Later projects included those by artists including John Latham, Rita Donagh, Gerald Newman and Stephen Willats.

References

Arts centres in London
Contemporary art galleries in London
Art galleries established in 1973
1973 establishments in England
1973 establishments in the United Kingdom
1978 disestablishments in England